Anastrangalia haldemani is a species of beetle from family Cerambycidae, that could be found in Canada, United States, and Mexico.

References

Lepturinae
Beetles described in 1891
Beetles of North America